Bernardo Henao Mejía was a Colombian physician and politician.

During the government of the General Gustavo Rojas Pinilla, he served as Minister of Public Health of Colombia. He also was Acting Minister of Agriculture.

References 

Colombian physicians
Colombian Ministers of Health
Colombian Ministers of Agriculture